Cathy Featherstone is a British set decorator. She was nominated for an Academy Award in the category Best Production Design for the film The Father.

Selected filmography 
 The Father (2020; co-nominated with Peter Francis)

References

External links 

Living people
Place of birth missing (living people)
Year of birth missing (living people)
British set decorators